The list of ship commissionings in 1920 includes a chronological list of ships commissioned in 1920.  In cases where no official commissioning ceremony was held, the date of service entry may be used instead.


References

See also 

1920
 Ship commissionings
 Ship launches
Ship launches